Bolham is a hamlet in Nottinghamshire, England 1 mile north of Retford. Bolham Hall is an early 18th-century brick house of five bays. Bolham Mills on the River Idle is a tanning mill, the buildings being converted in the mid 19th century from a water-powered paper mill built circa 1800 .

References

Hamlets in Nottinghamshire
Retford
Bassetlaw District